was a Japanese politician from the Democratic Party of Japan, he served for a total of four terms in the Japanese House of Representatives representing Niigata's 1st District from 1983 to 1996.

References

1934 births
2014 deaths
People from Shinjuku
Democratic Party of Japan politicians
Members of the House of Representatives (Japan)
Deaths from cancer in Japan